Padmini Rout (born 5 January 1994) is an Indian chess player. She holds the titles of International Master (IM) and Woman Grandmaster (WGM). She is a four-time National Women's Premier title holder consecutively from 2014-2017 and was the Asian women's champion of 2018.

Rout was honoured with the Biju Patnaik Sports Award  for the year 2007 and the Ekalavya Award in 2009.

Career
In 2005 Rout won her first national title, under-11 girls at Nagpur. In 2006, she was both the Indian under-13 girls champion and the Asian under-12 girls champion. Rout won the U14 girls' section of both Asian and World Youth Chess Championships in 2008. The following year she finished first in the Asian Junior (Under-20) Girls Championship. In 2010, she won the Indian junior (U19) girls championship and took the bronze medal at both Asian and World Junior Girls Championships.

In the Asian Individual Women's Championship 2011 she tied for 2nd–6th places and won it in 2018. Rout won the Indian Women's Championship in 2014, 2015, 2016 and 2017. In 2015, she also became the Commonwealth women's champion.

Rout played for the Indian national team at Women's Chess Olympiad, Women's World Team Chess Championship and Women's Asian Team Chess Championship. 
She won an individual gold medal playing on the reserve board at the 2014 Women's Chess Olympiad in Tromsø, Norway. She has been part of the Indian women's team in the subsequent Chess Olympiads in 2016 at Baku, Azerbaijan and 2018 at Batumi, Georgia.

Personal life
Born in Barambagarh, Odisha, Padmini started playing chess at the age of 9 (2003) because of her father Dr. Ashok Kumar Rout's passion for the game. She did her schooling from D.A.V. Public School, Chandrasekharpur and graduated in Commerce from BJB College in Bhubaneswar.

Achievements 

 Won her first National under-11 girls in 2005 at Nagpur and also won National under-13 girls in Kolkata.
 Individual Gold medal for reserve board in Women's in Tromso Olympiad 2014
 Gold medal in Asian Continental Women 2018
 Four-times consecutive National Women's Premier Champion (2014-2017)
 Gold in Blitz, Silver in both Rapid and Classical format in Asian Nations Cup 2014 for Team India
 Gold in Blitz, Silver in Rapid and Bronze in Classical format in Asian Nations Cup 2018 for Team India
 Gold in Asian under-12 girls and under-14 girls in 2006 and 2008 respectively.
 Gold in Asian Junior (under-20) girls in 2009 and Bronze in 2010.
 Gold in Commonwealth Women's in 2015.
 Gold in World Youth under-14 in 2008.
 Bronze in World Junior 2010.
 Bronze in Asian Continental Women's Blitz in 2017.
 Bronze in Asian Indoor Games in Rapid for Team India in 2017.
 Won National Junior girls in 2010.
 Biju Patnaik Sports Award for the year 2007.
 Winner of Eklavya Award in 2009.

References

External links 

 
 
 

1994 births
Living people
Chess International Masters
Chess woman grandmasters
Indian female chess players
World Youth Chess Champions
Chess Olympiad competitors
Sportswomen from Odisha
Recipients of the Ekalavya Award
People from Cuttack district
21st-century Indian women
21st-century Indian people